The 2006 FIFA World Cup qualification CAF Group 5 was a CAF qualifying group for the 2006 FIFA World Cup. The group comprised Botswana, Guinea, Kenya, Malawi, Morocco and Tunisia.

The group was won by Tunisia, who qualified for the 2006 FIFA World Cup. Tunisia, Morocco and Guinea qualified for the 2006 Africa Cup of Nations.

Second round

Standings

Results

(due to unruly behaviour and stampede killing one person in the game against Morocco, This match was played behind closed doors)

References

5